Huli is a Tari language spoken by the Huli people of the Hela Province of Papua New Guinea. It has a pentadecimal (base-15) numeral system:  means 15,  means 15×2 = 30, and  means 15×15 = 225.

Huli has a pandanus language called  (bush divide taboo) used for collecting karuka nuts as well as hunting or traveling.   is used to evade malevolent bush spirits.

Phonology 

Huli has a syllable structure of (C)V.

Vowels 

/ɑ/ is pronounced more fronted as [æ] before /r/ and /ʝ/.

Vowel nasality is phonemic in the language.
Vowels can also carry three phonemic tones; high-falling, mid-level, and low-rising.

Consonants 

Stops /p t k/ can become aspirated as [pʰ tʰ kʰ].

Many speakers pronounce /t/ as [s] before /i/.

/d/ is realized as voiceless as [d̥] when occurring word-initially, and is palatalized as [dʲ] between /i/ and a word-final /ɑ/.

/r/ only occurs word-medially.

/b ɡ/ can be phonetically realized as fricatives intervocalically as [β ɣ].

References

External links
 Timothy Usher, New Guinea World, Huli on New Guinea World
Huli counting system 
Huli phonology
"Counting and number in Huli", Brian Cheetam. Papua New Guinea Journal of Education

Engan languages
Huli people
Languages of Southern Highlands Province
Pandanus avoidance registers